= Jan Flasieński =

Jan Flasieński (1789–1852) was a captain of artillery in the army of the Kingdom of Poland. He studied at the Jagiellonian University in Kraków, worked as a clerk in Warsaw, and was the author of the first Polish-language travellers' guidebook to Europe.
